The Europaeum is a network of eighteen universities in Europe. It was conceived of in 1990–1991 by Lord Weidenfeld and Sir Ronnie Grierson and they persuaded Roy Jenkins, who had just become Chancellor of the University of Oxford, to push this initiative in conjunction with the universities of Leiden, and Bologna. It has subsequently been supporting the "advancement of education through the encouragement of European studies in the University of Oxford and other European institutions of higher education having links with Oxford."

Outline
The Europaeum aims to promote movement of academic staff and students between these institutions, with ‘the study of the languages, history, cultures and professions of the people of Europe’. It brings together talented students and faculty working in the Humanities and the Social Sciences, to promote a better ‘sense of Europe’ through collaboration and academic mobility.

The Europaeum's mission

 to promote excellence in academic research and teaching collaboration between Europaeum partners
 to develop a 'pool of talent' to carry out research and inquiry into problems confronting Europe
 to act as an open academic network linking Europaeum partners and other bodies in the joint pursuit of study
 to provide opportunities for the joint undertaking of new pan-European initiatives
 to explore new ways for universities to fulfil their many roles in the new Learning Age
 to train and educate future leaders for a new Europe

For almost three decades, the Europaeum has successfully encouraged collaboration between European research universities, facilitated tripartite dialogue between academics, students, and those working in the public and private sectors, and has contributed to European-wide debates about culture, politics, and society, as well as established excellent faculty collaboration and student exchange; earned a reputation for organising strikingly successful student Spring and Summer Schools, public debates, seminars, joint teaching programmes, lectures and workshops; and run high quality linked scholarship schemes.

The Europaeum Scholars Programme (launched in 2018) is the latest venture to bring together the values and vision of the Europaeum, with a focus on themes such as inclusion, sustainability, and growth and development.

The Europaeum's belief is that today, we need more not less international collaboration, more not less emphasis on universities engaging with the wider society, and more not less connection between the disciplines. Fresh cohorts of talented young people, committed to making a difference for the better, are essential to shaping the future of Europe for the better.

History

1992–2000

The Europaeum's international network was launched in 1992 by Oxford, Leiden and Bologna. Oxford played the lead role, both spearheading a significant fund-raising drive across Europe, and giving the consortium the status of an official university department. The Europaeum helped to spawn two independent centres: the Institute for the Advanced Study of European and Comparative Law (IECL) and the Centre for European Politics, Economics and Society (CEPES), which closed in 2003.

A range of scholarships for European graduates to come to Oxford were set up as well as collaborative activities such as international conferences, summer schools, and academic mobility.

The network expanded to include Bonn University (Rheinische Friedrich-Wilhelms-Universität Bonn)  in 1996; then Paris I (Panthéon-Sorbonne) in 1997; the then Geneva HEI, now the Graduate Institute of International and Development Studies in 1998.

2000–2010

Charles University, Prague, joined in 2001, and the Europaeum Review was launched in the same year.

A regular newsletter was set up from Oxford, alongside its own website, and a database to try to link academics working in European Law, Politics and Economics. In 2003, a part-time Secretary-General (Dr Paul Flather) was appointed to oversee the overall growth and development of the Europaeum. The Europaeum Office moved from the Central University Offices to rented offices on the Banbury Road, leased from the Oxford Voltaire Foundation, and the organisation became a Charity (Registration Number 1105477) in 2004. Academic mobility was boosted under the Europaeum Visiting Academics scheme enabling leading academics to teach and research at partner institutions within the association, helping nourish future academic and teaching links. Two innovative programmes, an MA in European Politics, Culture, History and Institutions, linking Bologna, Leiden and Oxford, and a plan for modular programmes in European Business, Culture, and Institutions, initially to link Leiden and Oxford, were run as pilot projects.

In 2003, Complutense University of Madrid joined the Europaeum. Helsinki University followed in 2004, and the Jagiellonian University, Kraków, in 2005, bringing the association to its target of 10 members.

In 2004–2005, Oxford, Paris and Leiden launched a new jointly-offered Europaeum MA in European History and Civilisation. Three new major themed programmes were launched, each running with linked workshops, seminars, conferences and lectures: the Humanities and New Technology programme in 2003, the Islam-in-Europe programme in 2004, and the US-Europe TransAtlantic Dialogue programme in 2005.

Following the death of Roy Jenkins in 2003, one of the founders of the Europaeum and former Chancellor of the University of Oxford, a memorial fund was set up to raise funds for European scholarships, and these have been directly linked to the Europaeum by the trustees. The first two awards were made in 2004 and the scheme ended in 2017 due to lack of further funds.

2010 to 2016

A new Board of Trustees was established in 2009–10, to take over fund-raising, networking and overall supervisory duties from the more cumbersome Council, which was converted into the Academic Council focussing on academic matters. The trustees included the two founding fathers, George Weidenfeld and  Ronald Grierson, as well as the third co-opted member of the former Europaeum Council, with M Keller elected to the chair, while Dr Andrew Graham from Oxford was appointed a permanent chair of the Academic Council to ensure continuity.

Pompeu-Fabra University (Barcelona) joined in 2012, and Ludwig Maximilian University of Munich in 2015.

A new joint academic programme was launched in 2012 by the Universities of Prague, Leiden and Paris, around the theme of European Politics and Society, aiming for about 20 graduates spending their second year of study on a two-year graduate programme, at a partner institution. The programme was named in tribute to the late President of the Czech Republic and important human rights activist Vaclav Havel.

2016 to the present

From 2016 to 2020, Andrew Graham has led a substantial restructuring of the Europaeum. In particular he created and launched a new Europaeum Scholarship Programme and, as a result, the full university membership has subsequently grown from eleven in 2016 to eighteen.

New members included the University of St Andrews, the University of Luxembourg, KU Leuven, Freie Universitat Berlin, the Catholic University of Lisbon, the University of Copenhagen, Bologna (who re-joined), and the University of Tartu. The Central European University (Budapest/Vienna) was added as a special member for a limited period in recognition and support of their circumstances.

In addition, Dr Graham became Executive Chair, Dr Hartmut Mayer was appointed as Acting Director (Dr Flather having stood down from being Secretary General), the Governance was modernised (with a new smaller Executive Committee, chaired by Dr Graham, replacing the Steering Committee).(- see Press Release), Dr Tracey Sowerby was appointed Programme Director to lead the Scholars Programme and an Alumni Programme was initiated. The Europaeum offices moved to premises belonging to St Antony's College (Oxford) in 2018, and the restructuring phase of the Europaeum was followed by the appointment of a full-time Director in October 2020, Dr Marcin Walecki. Dr Hartmut Mayer took on the role of Executive Chair and Dr Andrew Graham joined the Board of Trustees.

Workshops, Conferences and Colloquia
The Europaeum organises and facilitates a number of workshops, seminars, conferences and colloquia every year, for the benefit of postgraduate students enrolled in a member institution. The core events are: Spring School and Summer School, Classics Colloquium and Policy Seminar (usually in Brussels). Other events are organised in addition, following suggestions and initiatives by members. Three themes determine content and concept of all Europaeum activities: European History & Civilisation; European Policy-Making; European Liberal Democracy & Citizen Engagement.

Joint MA programmes
The Europaeum is involved in three Joint MA Programmes:

The MA European History and Civilization: Partner universities of the one-year degree MA European History and Civilisation are the Leiden University, University of Paris 1 Pantheon-Sorbonne and the University of Oxford. Participating students will visit each of these universities for one trimester. [see report by Green Templeton College https://www.gtc.ox.ac.uk/news-and-events/news/europaeum-students-oxford/]

The Europaeum Václav Havel Masters Programme (EMAP): named after Václav Havel, the late Czech dissident and President, is a two-years Masters Programme in European Society and Politics. This programme is organized by the Leiden University, University of Paris 1 Pantheon-Sorbonne and the Charles University in Prague.

The MA European Politics & Society (Charles University) [see http://www.epsmaster.eu/]: offered by Charles University as leading partner (Prague), plus Jagellonian University (Krakow), Leiden University and Pompeu Fabra University (Barcelona), with the help of Erasmus Mundus funding. A two-year programme that starts in Prague and subsequently offers different options.

Scholarship schemes

Europaeum Scholars Programme

Launched in January 2018 with thirty selected doctoral students from the member Universities, the Europaeum Scholars Programme is a two-year long innovative initiative that draws together talented scholars from across Europe who are committed to making a difference. Its cross-disciplinary, cross-university and cross-cultural nature combined with a strong practical ethos and collaborative project work provides scholars with a firm grounding with which to tackle the challenges facing Europe today.

Study bursaries

The Europaeum organises study bursaries in cooperation with Charles University (Prague), the Graduate Institute in Geneva and Helsinki University. These support an Oxford graduate to pursue a short period of research at these member institutions, and one from each of these member institutions to come to Oxford on a self-directed research trip.

Jenkins Memorial Scholarship (ended) 
The Jenkins Scholarship Scheme honoured the lifelong achievements of Roy Jenkins, the former President of the European Commission (1976–1981) and Chancellor of the University of Oxford (1987–2003). This scholarship finished in 2017 due to lack of further funds.

Members

The Europaeum currently has eighteen members universities located in fifteen countries. Germany, Spain, and the United Kingdom are the only countries with more than one member institution.

Catholic University of Leuven

Charles University

University of Copenhagen

University of Helsinki

University of Paris 1 Pantheon-Sorbonne

Ludwig Maximilian University of Munich
Free University of Berlin

University of Bologna

Leiden University

University of Luxembourg

Jagiellonian University

Catholic University of Portugal

Pompeu Fabra University
Complutense University of Madrid

Graduate Institute of International and Development Studies

University of Oxford
University of St Andrews

University of Tartu

See also
Anne Dreydel, who initially twinned the Universities of Oxford and Bonn

References

External links
Europaeum – Official site
Europaeum MA Programme  – MA Programme in European History and Civilization
Vaclav Havel Programme- Masters Programme in European Society and Politics
Jenkins Memorial Scholarship

College and university associations and consortia in Europe
Organisations based in Oxford
St Antony's College, Oxford